Buerk is a surname. Notable people with the surname include:

 Michael Buerk (born 1946), English journalist
 Roland Buerk (born 1973), English journalist, son of Michael

See also
 Berk (name)
 Burk (disambiguation)
 Burke
 Burek